The  is a rubber-tyred metro line located in Sapporo, Hokkaido, Japan. It is part of the Sapporo Municipal Subway system. Its name literally means "East-West Line", and it runs from Miyanosawa Station in Nishi-ku to Shin-Sapporo Station in Atsubetsu-ku. The Tōzai Line color on maps is orange, and its stations carry the letter "T" followed by a number.

Station list
 All stations are located in Sapporo.
 The entire line is underground.

History 
 June 10, 1976: Kotoni – Shiroishi section opens; 6000 series trains debut.
 March 21, 1982: Shiroishi – Shin-Sapporo section opens.
 March 22, 1987: Nishi-Jūitchōme – Ōdōri section closed due to construction of connecting track to Tōhō Line
 August 18, 1998: 8000 series trains debut.
 February 25, 1999: Kotoni – Miyanosawa section opens.
 2002: 6000 series trains begin to be replaced by 8000 series trains.
 July 7, 2006: 8000 series trains optimized for driver-only operation debut.
 February 13, 2008: Platform edge doors installed at Nangō-Nana-Chōme Station for testing prior to line-wide deployment
 August 30, 2008: Last 6000 series trains are taken out of service.
 January 30, 2009: SAPICA contactless smart card introduced.
 March 3, 2009: Platform edge doors installed at all Tōzai Line stations.
 April 1, 2009: Tōzai Line switches to wanman driver-only operation.
 July 13, 2009: "Women and Children Comfort Cars" introduced.

References

External links

 Sapporo City Transportation Bureau 

Sapporo Municipal Subway
Rail transport in Hokkaido
Railway lines opened in 1976
1976 establishments in Japan